Kresgeville is an unincorporated community in Monroe County, Pennsylvania. Kresgeville has a post office with ZIP code 18333, which opened on January 5, 1846.

Climate
This climatic region has large seasonal temperature differences, with warm to hot (and often humid) summers and cold (sometimes severely cold) winters.  The Köppen Climate Classification subtype for this climate is "Dfa" (Hot Summer Continental Climate).

Notable people
S. S. Kresge, founder of Kmart

References

Unincorporated communities in Monroe County, Pennsylvania
Unincorporated communities in Pennsylvania